The Yutaje Falls is the third-highest waterfall in Venezuela. It is 2,200 ft (671 m) in height. It is a system of two identical cascades which are located in northern Amazonas state.

References

External links
Travel guide including a visit to the falls
Photos of the falls and the surrounding jungle

Waterfalls of Venezuela
Natural monuments of Venezuela